Cerithiopsis althea is a species of very small sea snail, a marine gastropod mollusk in the family Cerithiopsidae. This species was described by William Healey Dall in 1927.

Description

Habitat

References

althea
Taxa named by William Healey Dall
Gastropods described in 1927